Fulda is an electoral constituency (German: Wahlkreis) represented in the Bundestag. It elects one member via first-past-the-post voting. Under the current constituency numbering system, it is designated as constituency 174. It is located in eastern Hesse, comprising the Fulda district and the southeastern part of the Vogelsbergkreis district.

Fulda was created for the inaugural 1949 federal election. Since 2005, it has been represented by Michael Brand of the Christian Democratic Union (CDU).

Geography
Fulda is located in eastern Hesse. As of the 2021 federal election, it comprises the entirety of the Fulda district, as well as the Vogelsbergkreis district excluding the municipalities of Alsfeld, Antrifttal, Feldatal, Gemünden (Felda), Homberg (Ohm), Kirtorf, Mücke, and Romrod.

History
Fulda was created in 1949. In the 1949 election, it was Hesse constituency 9 in the numbering system. In the 1953 through 1976 elections, it was number 134. From 1980 through 1998, it was number 132. In 2002 and 2005, it was number 176. In the 2009 election, it was number 175. Since 2013, it has been number 174.

Originally, the constituency comprised the independent city of Fulda and the districts of Landkreis Fulda, Lauterbach, and Schlüchtern. In the 1976 election, it comprised the district of Fulda excluding the municipalities of Burghaun, Eiterfeld, Hünfeld, Nüsttal, and Rasdorf; the municipalities of Bad Soden-Salmünster, Birstein, Brachttal, Schlüchtern, Sinntal, Steinau, Wächtersbach, Züntersbach, and the Gutsbezirk Spessart area from the Main-Kinzig-Kreis district; and the municipalities of Freiensteinau, Grebenhain, Herbstein, Lauterbach, Lautertal, Schlitz, Schotten, Ulrichstein, and Wartenberg from the Vogelsbergkreis district. In the 2002 election, it acquired borders very similar to its current configuration, but including the municipalities of Birstein, Schlüchtern, Sinntal, and Steinau an der Straße from Main-Kinzig-Kreis district, and the municipality of Schwalmtal from Vogelsbergkreis district. It acquired its current borders in the 2013 election.

Members
The constituency has been held continuously by the Christian Democratic Union (CDU) since its creation. It was first represented by Anton Sabel from 1949 to 1957, followed by Hermann Götz from 1957 to 1976. Alfred Dregger then served from 1976 to 1998, when he was succeeded by Martin Hohmann. Hohmann was expelled from the CDU group in 2003 for antisemitic comments, and served as an independent for the rest of his term. Michael Brand was elected in 2005, and re-elected in 2009, 2013, 2017, and 2021.

Election results

2021 election

2017 election

2013 election

2009 election

Notes

References

Federal electoral districts in Hesse
1949 establishments in West Germany
Constituencies established in 1949
Fulda (district)
Vogelsbergkreis